Mohsin Atta Khan Khosa is a Pakistani politician who has been a member of the Provincial Assembly of the Punjab since August 2018.

Political career

He was elected to the Provincial Assembly of the Punjab as an independent candidate from Constituency PP-288 (Dera Ghazi Khan-IV) in 2018 Pakistani general election. Following his successful election, he joined Pakistan Tehreek-e-Insaf (PTI). He de-seated due to vote against party policy for Chief Minister of Punjab election  on 16 April 2022.

References

Living people
Pakistan Tehreek-e-Insaf MPAs (Punjab)
Year of birth missing (living people)